Bruce Louis Elia (born January 10, 1953) is a former college and professional American football player.  In college, Elia played on both the offensive and defensive teams for The Ohio State Buckeyes.  Professionally, he was a linebacker, primarily with the San Francisco 49ers.

Early years
Elia is one of the few Ohio State players in the modern era to start on both the offensive and defensive teams. He grew up in Cliffside Park, New Jersey and graduated from Cliffside Park High School in 1971, where he had played as both a running back and linebacker.  He was recruited to Ohio State by head coach Woody Hayes as a fullback.  Before the third game of the 1972 season, Elia was claimed by The Ohio State defensive coordinator, and made into a linebacker.

Early in the 1973 season starting fullback Champ Henson was injured, and freshman backup Pete Johnson was judged unready to take over.  Hayes moved Elia back to the offense as fullback.  That season Elia led the Buckeyes in scoring (14 touchdowns for 84 points).  In 1974, he returned to linebacker and was the team's leading tackler (144 - 74 solo, 70 assisted).

NFL career
Elia was selected in the fourth round of the 1975 NFL Draft by the Miami Dolphins as a linebacker.  Prior to the 1976 season he was taken by the Tampa Bay Buccaneers in the expansion draft.  Tampa then traded Elia, wide receiver Willie McGee and a second-round draft pick to the San Francisco 49ers for quarterback Steve Spurrier.  Elia spent the next three years with the 49ers.

After football
Elia is currently a real estate broker in Fort Lee, New Jersey and resides in Cliffside Park.

References

1953 births
Living people
Cliffside Park High School alumni
People from Cliffside Park, New Jersey
Sportspeople from Bergen County, New Jersey
Sportspeople from Hoboken, New Jersey
Players of American football from New Jersey
American football fullbacks
American football linebackers
Ohio State Buckeyes football players
Miami Dolphins players
San Francisco 49ers players